Aragonese or Aragones may refer to:
 Something related to Aragon, an autonomous community and former kingdom in Spain
 the Aragonese people, those originating from or living in the historical region of Aragon, in north-eastern Spain
 the Aragonese language, a Romance language currently spoken in the northernmost area of Aragon
 the Navarro-Aragonese language, a Romance language spoken in the Middle Ages in parts of the Ebro basin and Middle Pyrenees 
 Aragonese cuisine, refers to the typical dishes and ingredients of cuisine in the Aragon region of Spain
 the Aragonese grape, also known as Grenache
 the Aragones grape, also known as Alicante Bouschet
 the music of Aragon
 the medieval Kingdom of Aragon
 the medieval Crown of Aragon, which included the Kingdom of Aragon as a constituent part
 the list of Aragonese monarchs from the medieval Kingdom of Aragon
 Aragonese Castle on the Italian island of Ischia, also known as Castello Aragonese
 the Aragonese Crusade, part of the War of the Sicilian Vespers
 Aragonés (surname)